James Singh may refer to:

 James Sargolsem Singh, Indian footballer
 James Lukram Singh (born 1981), Indian footballer
 James Shankar Singh (1924–2014), Fiji Indian farmer, businessman and politician